Jeedar is a 1981 Pakistani action film. Directed by Kaifee, also known as simply Kaifi and produced by Amina Fyaz. The film starring Sultan Rahi, Anjuman, Mustafa Qureshi, Adeeb.

Film's Release
Jeedar was a film released on (Eid-ul-Azha ) 1401 hijri (on Friday, October 9, 1981).

Cast

 Sultan Rahi
 Mustafa Qureshi
 Kifayat Hussain Bhatti (Kaifee)
 Chakori
 Anjuman
 Nannha
 Adeeb
 Jaggi Malik
 Munir Zarif

Track list
The soundtrack was composed by the musician Tafoo, with lyrics by Khawaja Pervez and sung by Noor Jehan, Naheed Akhtar, Mehnaz and Inayat Hussain Bhatti.

References

External links
 

1981 films
Pakistani action films
Punjabi-language Pakistani films
1980s Punjabi-language films
1981 action films